The Steppingstone Museum is a non-profit educational and cultural institution on the Susquehanna River, northwest of Havre de Grace, Maryland, whose mission is to preserve and interpret the rural heritage of Harford County, Maryland.  

The museum displays and preserves the private collection of 7,000 tools and artifacts amassed by J. Edmund Bull along with later accessions. The Bull collection was first displayed at his home, which he called Steppingstone. In 1979, the museum relocated to the former Gilman Paul property, an 18th-century farm now in Susquehanna State Park, and the museum was expanded to include demonstrations of various trades commonplace in rural America of the 19th century.  Barns and farm buildings exhibit the work of broom makers, blacksmiths, stone cutters, masons, and other tradesmen.

The museum programs special events relating to 19th- and early 20th-century history.

References

External links

Farm museums in Maryland
Buildings and structures in Havre de Grace, Maryland
Historic house museums in Maryland
Living museums in Maryland
Museums in Harford County, Maryland